This is a list of women writers who were born in the Philippines or whose writings are closely associated with that country.

A
Victorina A. Abellanosa (1903–1968), Cebuano dramatist
Mila D. Aguilar (born 1949), poet, essayist, educator
Erlinda K. Alburo (active since 1970s), poet, Cebuano scholar
Estrella Alfon (1917–1983), short story writer, playwright, journalist
Cora Almerino (active since 1990s), poet
Mia Alvar (active since 1999), short story writer
Ivy Alvarez (active since 2000), poet, editor, reviewer
Encarnacion Alzona (1895–2001), historian, educator, suffragist
Liwayway Arceo (1920–1999), novelist, journalist, radio scriptwriter

B
Felisa Batacan (active since the 1990s), journalist, novelist, short story writer
Lualhati Bautista (1945–2023), novelist
Merlinda Bobis (born 1959), playwright, short story writer, novelist
Cecilia Manguerra Brainard (born 1947), novelist, short story writer, non-fiction writer

C
Linda Ty Casper (born 1931), novelist, short story writer
Lourdes Castrillo Brillantes (active since 1980s), Spanish-language writer, educator
Martha Cecilia (1953–2014), romance novelist
Arlene J. Chai (born 1955), Filipino-Chinese-Australian novelist
Josefina Constantino (born 1920), essayist, critic, poet, nun
Gilda Cordero-Fernando (1930–2020), publisher, short story writer, non-fiction writer
Sheila Coronel (active since 2003), journalist, educator
Conchitina Cruz (active since 1998), poet, educator

D
Ophelia Alcantara Dimalanta (1932–2010), poet, editor, playwright, educator

E
Lina Espina-Moore (1919–2000), Cebuano short story writer, novelist
Damiana Eugenio (1921–2014), folklorist, educator
Marjorie Evasco (born 1953), poet, feminist

F
Lina Flor (1914–1976), radio scriptwriter, columnist, biographer
Leona Florentino (1849–1884), poet writing in Spanish and Ilocano

G
Candy Gourlay (born 1962), journalist, children's writer
Evelyn May Guinid (born 1971), romance novelist

H
Jessica Hagedorn (born 1949), Filipino-American playwright, novelist, mixed-media artist
Rosa Henson (1927–1997), autobiographer
Margie Holmes (active since 1973), non-fiction writer, columnist, popular psychologist
Cristina Pantoja-Hidalgo (born 1944), non-fiction writer, fictionist, and professor

I
Luisa Aguilar Igloria (born 1961), Filipino-American poet

J
Magdalena Jalandoni (1891–1978), autobiographer, poet, novelist, short story writer
Armie Jarin-Bennett (active since 1980s), journalist, television presenter, executive CNN director
Rina Jimenez-David (born 1955), journalist, columnist

K
Karen Kunawicz (active since 1990s), poet, journalist, columnist, broadcaster

M
Melba Padilla Maggay (born 1950), social anthropologist, journalist, non-fiction writer
Angela Manalang-Gloria (1907–1995), poet
Paz Márquez-Benítez (1894–1983), short story writer
Genoveva Matute (1915–2009), short story writer 
Armine Rhea Mendoza (active since the 1990s), romance novelist
Hilda Montaire (1922–2004), short story writer, novelist
Virginia R. Moreno (1923–2021), poet, playwright, film director

O
Maria Odulio de Guzman (active since 1960s), lexicographer
Gilda Olvidado (born 1957), novelist, scriptwriter

P
Loreto Paras-Sulit (1908–2008), short story writer
Elena Patron (1933–2021), Tagalog columnist, comics writer, novelist
Kerima Polotan Tuvera (1925–2011), short story writer, novelist, essayist

R
Soledad Reyes (born 1946), novelist, essayist
Sophia Romero (active since 1998), novelist
Ninotchka Rosca (born 1946), novelist, non-fiction writer

S
Michelle Cruz Skinner (born 1965), short story writer, educator
Maria Teresa Cruz San Diego (active since 1992), romance novelist
Miriam Defensor Santiago (1945–2016), politician, non-fiction writer
Pura Santillan-Castrence (1905–2007), essayist, columnist, diplomat
Shirley Siaton (active since the 1990s), playwright, journalist, poet
Lakambini Sitoy (born 1969), novelist, short story writer, journalist, educator

T
Eileen Tabios (born 1960), poet, novelist, publisher
Gina Marissa Tagasa-Gil (active since 1980s), scriptwriter for television, film
Trinidad Tarrosa-Subido (1912–1994), linguist, poet
Edith Tiempo (1919–2011), poet, novelist, short story writer
Rowena Tiempo Torrevillas (born 1951), poet, novelist, essayist

U
Azucena Grajo Uranza (1929–2012), novelist, short story writer, playwright

Z
Jessica Zafra (born 1965), essayist, columnist

-
Filipino women writers, List of
Writers
Women writers, List of Filipino